stOrk is the debut album by the experimental metal band stOrk, released in 2011.

Track listing

Personnel
 Shane Gibson - guitar, vocals
 Thomas Lang - drums
 Eloy Palacios - bass

Additional personnel
 JP Von Hitchburg - vocals
 Jonathan Weed - guitar

Production
 Maor Appelbaum - mastering
 Nick D'Virgilio - engineering
 Jeremy S.H. Griffith - mixing
 Erika Kimura - logo art
 Sam Shearon - artwork

References

External links
 stOrk at allmusic

2011 albums
StOrk albums